The Cowboy Channel (formerly FamilyNet) is an American cable television network in over 42 million cable and satellite homes, which carries Western and rodeo sports. The network was founded in 1979 as the National Christian Network, and took the name FamilyNet in 1988 under the ownership of Jerry Falwell. It is owned by Patrick Gottsch, who also owns RFD-TV; Gottsch operates both channels under the brand Rural Media Group.

History

As FamilyNet

The channel was acquired by InTouch Ministries in October 2007 from the Southern Baptist Convention. In December 2009, FamilyNet was acquired by Robert A. Schuller's ComStar Media Fund. In 2010, FamilyNet was spun out into its own company, with Robert A. Schuller as the chairman.

The organization also operated FamilyNet Radio 161, a full-time Christian talk channel on Sirius Satellite Radio, but was discontinued on November 30, 2010; FamilyTalk replaced it.

From 2011 to 2012, the channel showed sitcoms like The Bob Newhart Show, Newhart, and Mr. Belvedere.

On October 24, 2012, Rural TV purchased FamilyNet, and the transaction took effect on January 1, 2013. At first the network was used to carry an all-trading day format of farm and market news, which eventually moved to a reduced timeslot on RFD-TV due to low interest and ratings. Rural Media, which had considered merging RFD-TV and FamilyNet together to gain over-the-air carriage, eventually decided to keep FamilyNet as a separate service, but with a refocus in programming towards classic television programming which was not picked up by competitors MeTV, Antenna TV and Cozi TV. Rural Media also decided not to renew over-the-air contracts with stations in a slow process in order to make it a cable-only network. A number of former FamilyNet affiliates (mainly religious stations) continue to carry programming recorded from the network's feed before the Rural TV sale, seemingly under a perpetual license.

In September 2014, FamilyNet was refocused with classic television series and films from the Sony Pictures Television libraries, with Sony also assisting with advertising sales. Religious programming, which used to make up the vast majority of the schedule under SBC and Schuller's ownership, was limited to Sunday mornings, though Rural Media also maintained FamilyNet's paid programming overnights despite their executives' traditional disdain for depending on those programs for revenue. (RFD-TV since also began to carry overnight paid programming.)

As The Cowboy Channel
On June 19, 2017, Rural Media Group CEO Patrick Gottsch announced that on July 1, FamilyNet would be rebranded as The Cowboy Channel, featuring a focus on Western sports and rodeo events, which had proven to be a popular attraction on RFD-TV. Gottsch thanked Sony Pictures Television for bringing the network to a solid footing, but noted that overwhelming competition in the classic television space from networks such as MeTV, Antenna TV, Cozi TV, Heroes & Icons and several other networks and streaming options had made the space more competitive and crowded, while a Western sports network was seen as a unique opportunity to stand out in cable and satellite lineups. Among the network's first offerings were encore events from RFD's The American Rodeo, the Calgary Stampede, and the Professional Bull Riders archives. Sony's archived programming thus moved to their own GetTV at the start of 2018.

The Cowboy Channel signed a multi-year agreement with the Professional Rodeo Cowboys Association to televise their major events, including the National Finals Rodeo, starting in 2020.

With the network conversion, Rural Media used the opportunity to end their carriage agreements with over-the-air broadcasters, rendering the Cowboy Channel as a pay-TV only offering.

A Canadian version of the channel was launched on February 1, 2020 on Shaw Direct television systems through a partnership with Rural Media.

Programming
Much of the Cowboy Channel's non-sports programming is drawn from RFD-TV's program library, with an emphasis on ranching and rodeo programs (thus the Cowboy Channel does not carry RFD-TV's music, agribusiness or news programming). Like RFD-TV, the Cowboy Channel carries brokered televangelism programming on Sunday mornings.

Current programming
 Best of America By Horseback
 Chris Cox Horsemanship
 Cinch High School Rodeo Tour
 Cowboy Country TV
 Debbe Dunning's Dude Ranch Roundup
 Gentle Giants
 Honky Tonk Ranch
 Little Britches Rodeo
 Out There with Baxter Black
 PRCA Rodeo
 RanchHer
 Red Steagall is Somewhere West of Wall Street
 Ride Smart
 The American Rancher
 The Cowboys' Kitchen
 Western Sports Roundup
 Western Trading Post
 Wild Spayed Filly Futurity
 Your Life Redefined

Reruns
The Lone Ranger
The Roy Rogers Show

References

External links

Television networks in the United States
Sports television networks in the United States
Companies based in Omaha, Nebraska
Companies based in Nashville, Tennessee
Television channels and stations established in 1979